Wilberforce Kityo Luwalira is an Anglican Bishop in Uganda:  he has been Bishop of Namirembe since 2009.

Luwalira of Namirembe Diocese was born on 8 December 1958 in Kiwenda, Wakiso District. He was educated at Balitta Nursery School, Namulonge Primary School and  Kololo Secondary School. He was ordained deacon on 14 December 1986  and priest on 27 November 1988.

References 

1958 births
Living people
21st-century Anglican bishops in Uganda
People from Wakiso District
Anglican bishops of Namirembe